The Tokyo Charity Classic was a professional golf tournament that was held in Japan from 1973 to 1976. It was an event on the Japan Golf Tour and hosted at different courses in the Greater Tokyo Area.

Winners

References

Former Japan Golf Tour events
Defunct golf tournaments in Japan
Recurring sporting events established in 1973
Recurring sporting events disestablished in 1976